First Contact is an Australian reality television documentary series that aired on SBS One, SBS Two and NITV. It documents the journey of six European Australians who are challenged over a period of 28 days about their pre-existing perceptions of Indigenous Australians.

Overview
First Contact shows some of the cultural divisions that exist between Indigenous and non-Indigenous Australians, and highlights the lack of awareness many non-Indigenous Australians have about Indigenous Australians and the various different cultures and lifestyles they currently maintain.  A stated premise is that 60% of European Australian have never had any contact with Indigenous people, a statistic that may explain the prevalence of the racist, unsympathetic and generally prejudicial attitudes that are often directed towards Indigenous Australians.

In making their 'first contact' with Indigenous Australia, the selected six participants are taken to Aboriginal communities both in the city and the country, and are even processed into a regional prison at Roebourne in Western Australia, where social problems are particularly acute, resulting in incarceration of large numbers of Indigenous Australians, often for quite minor offences. The relationships between Indigenous people and local police in Roebourne are notoriously poor.

Production

First Contact was filmed and set in New South Wales, home to the largest Indigenous Australian population of any state/territory, the Northern Territory, where Indigenous Australians make up a higher percentage of the population than in any other state or territory and Western Australia.

Discussion
After the series aired, First Contact was the topic of an Insight episode, hosted by Stan Grant and featuring a discussion involving many of the people who were involved in the show.

Series overview

The show is estimated to have had a cumulative reach of 1,847,000 Australian viewers.

Episodes

Season 1 (2014)

Season 2 (2016)

Cast
(As themselves)

Six Participants 2014
Alice Lardner
Bo-Dene Steiler
Jasmine Johnston
Trent Giles
Sandy Clifford
Marcus Solomon

Major Indigenous Contributors 2014

Sharyn Derschow – Co-founder Linkidge Cross Communication Training Company
Margaret Gudumurrkuwuy – Elcho Island Arts
Marmingee Hand – School Teacher & Foster Carer for F.A.S.D children
Marcus Lacey – Traditional Owner, Teacher & Tourist Business Operator
Debra Maidment – Safe & Sober Support Service Program, Central Australia Aboriginal Congress
Victor Morgan – Senior Educator, Education Centre Against Violence & Chair Link-Up NSW
June Oscar AO – CEO Marninwarntikura Women’s Resource Centre
Emily Carter – Deputy CEO Marninwarntikura Women’s Resource Centre
Shane Phillips – CEO Tribal Warrior & Local Australian of the Year 2013 
Geraldine Stewart – Yipirinya School HIPPY Coordinator
Tangentyere Council Night Patrol

Six Participants 2016
Natalie Imbruglia
Ian Dickson
David Oldfield
Tom Ballard
Renae Ayris
Nicki Wendt

Major Indigenous Contributors 2016

Mother Nature

Adaptations
The series was adapted for Canadian television by APTN, which premiered First Contact in 2018.

See also
 Go Back to Where You Came From
 Filthy Rich and Homeless

References

External links
First Contact SBS – Official Website
SBS’s First Contact is the real ‘festering sore’ of the nation On The Conversation

English-language television shows
Special Broadcasting Service original programming
2010s Australian documentary television series
2010s Australian reality television series
2014 Australian television series debuts
Television shows set in the Northern Territory
Television shows set in Western Australia
Television shows set in Sydney
Indigenous Australian television series